Garages of the Valley is a single-movement orchestral composition by the American composer Mason Bates.  The work was jointly commissioned by the Saint Paul Chamber Orchestra and the Milwaukee Symphony Orchestra.  The world premiere was performed on March 6, 2014 in Stillwater, Minnesota by the Saint Paul Chamber Orchestra under conductor Scott Yoo. The European premiere was performed on June 30, 2015 in Ingolstadt, Germany during the opening concert of the 2015 Audi Sommerkonzerte Festival by the San Francisco Symphony Youth Orchestra under conductor Donato Cabrera. The piece is dedicated to Dutch conductor Edo de Waart.

Composition
Garages of the Valley is composed in a single movement and has a duration of roughly 10 minutes.  It was inspired by the garages in Silicon Valley that "housed the visionaries behind Apple, Hewlett Packard, Intel, and Google."  Bates wrote in the score program notes:

Instrumentation
The work is scored for an orchestra comprising three flutes (2nd doubling alto flute, all doubling piccolo), two oboes (2nd doubling English horn), two clarinets (2nd doubling E-flat clarinet and bass clarinet), two bassoons, two French horns, two trumpets, one or two percussionists (on marimba, wood block, sandpaper blocks, djembe, suspended cymbal, bongo drums, glockenspiel, triangle, xylophone, bass drum), and strings.

Reception
Reviewing the world premiere, Rob Hubbard of the St. Paul Pioneer Press wrote:
Hubbard added, "The work demonstrated Bates to be a composer with a vivid imagination. You're likely to be hearing a lot from him in coming years."  Elaine Schmidt of the Milwaukee Journal Sentinel called the piece "effervescent" and lauded, "the piece began with short bursts of melodic and harmonic activity that eventually coalesced in an engaging work that's somehow full of positive energy."

References

Compositions by Mason Bates
2014 compositions
Compositions for symphony orchestra
Music commissioned by the Saint Paul Chamber Orchestra
Music commissioned by the Milwaukee Symphony Orchestra